Blake of Scotland Yard is a 1927 American silent action film serial directed and co-written by Robert F. Hill. It starred Hayden Stevenson, Grace Cunard and Monte Montague, plus an uncredited appearance by Walter Brennan. It was followed by a sequel, 1929's The Ace of Scotland Yard.

Cast
 Hayden Stevenson - Angus Blake
 Grace Cunard - Queen of Diamonds
 Gloria Grey - Lady Diane Blanton
 Herbert Prior - Lord Blanton
 Monte Montague - Jarvis
 Wilbur Mack - Albert Drexel
 Al Hart - The Spider (as Albert Hart)
 Walter Brennan - Henchman (uncredited)
 George Burton - Henchman (uncredited)
 Jack Kennedy - Henchman (uncredited)

Chapter titles
 The Mystery Of The Blooming Gardenia
 Death In The Laboratory
 Cleared Mysteries
 The Mystery Of The Silver Fox
 Death In The River
 The Criminal Shadow
 Face To Face
 The Fatal Trap
 Parisian House Tops
 Battle Royal
 The Burning Fuse
 The Roofs Of Limehouse
 The Sting Of The Scorpion
 The Scorpion Unmasked
 The Trap Is Sprung

See also
 List of film serials
 List of film serials by studio

References

External links

1927 films
1920s action films
American silent serial films
American black-and-white films
American action films
Universal Pictures film serials
Films directed by Robert F. Hill
Lost American films
Films set in London
1927 lost films
Silent action films
1920s American films